Wescley is a given name. Notable people with the name include:

Wescley (footballer, born 1984), Brazilian football centre-back
Wescley (footballer, born 1991), Brazilian football attacking midfielder

See also 

Wesley (disambiguation)

Masculine given names